Wyn Jones may refer to:
Wyn Jones (police officer) (born c. 1943), British police officer, Assistant Commissioner of the Metropolitan Police
Wyn Jones (rugby union) (born 1992), Welsh rugby union player

See also
Alun Wyn Jones (born 1985), Welsh rugby union player
David Wyn Jones (born 1950), British musicologist
Enid Wyn Jones (1909–1967), Welsh nurse
Ieuan Wyn Jones (born 1949), Welsh politician
Richard Wyn Jones (born 1966), Welsh political scientist